Decleva is a surname. Notable people with the surname include:

Enrico Decleva (1941–2020), Italian historian
Zoltán Decleva (1887–1950), Hungarian military officer